"Such a Shame" is a song written by Mark Hollis for the English band Talk Talk's second album It's My Life (1984). It was released as the album's second single and went on to become a top 10 hit across Europe.

Overview
"Such a Shame" was inspired by Luke Rhinehart's The Dice Man, one of composer Mark Hollis' favourite books. When asked what drove him to respond to Rhinehart's book, Hollis replied, "A good book, not a lifestyle I'd recommend."

The song was released as the album's second single in early 1984, with the cover art designed by James Marsh. Some pressings of the single came with an additional 7" release The Talk Talk Demos which included three songs recorded in June 1981: "Candy", "Talk Talk" and "Mirror Man". Writing in the NME, Richard Cook slated the song, describing it as "faceless regret coaxed from lurex trashcan."

"Such a Shame" became a hit in continental Europe in 1984 and 1985, reaching the top 10 in several countries, including number 1 in Switzerland. It was their third number 1 single after the remixed version of the song "Talk Talk" which topped the South African charts in 1983 and the single "It's My Life" which was number 1 in the US Billboard Hot Dance Club Play in 1984. In the US, "Such a Shame" entered the Billboard Hot 100, and was a top 20 hit in the Billboard Hot Dance Club Play. The single entered the  top 10 in the pan-European singles airplay chart. It only reached number 49 in the UK.

The song was featured in a European TV commercial for the French car Peugeot 205 in the 1980s. In November 1990, the single was re-issued to promote the compilation Natural History: The Very Best of Talk Talk.

Following Hollis' death in early 2019, "Such a Shame" charted at number 5 on Digital Song Sales in France and number 44 on Back Catalogue Singles in the Flemish region of Belgium.

Track listings

Original release
 7" single (EMI 5433)
A. "Such a Shame" — 3:59
B. "Again, a Game... Again" — 4:06

 12" maxi single (12EMI 5433)
A. "Such a Shame" (12" Mix) — 6:54
B1. "Such a Shame" — 5:43
B2. "Again, a Game... Again" — 4:06

1990 release
 7" single (R 6276)
A. "Such a Shame" (Original Version) — 4:28
B. "Dum Dum Girl" (Live from 1986 Montreux Jazz Festival) — 3:39

 12" maxi single (12R 6276)
A. "Such a Shame" (Remixed by Gary Miller) — 5:40
B1. "Such a Shame" (Original Version) — 4:28
B2. "Dum Dum Girl" (Live from 1986 Montreux Jazz Festival) — 3:39

 CD maxi single (CDR 6276)
"Such a Shame" (Original Version) — 4:28
"Such a Shame" (Remixed by Gary Miller) — 5:40
"Talk Talk" (Live from 1986 Montreux Jazz Festival) — 3:30
"Dum Dum Girl" (Live from 1986 Montreux Jazz Festival) — 3:39

Charts

Weekly charts

Year-end charts

Sandra version

German singer Sandra covered "Such a Shame" for her seventh studio album The Wheel of Time (2002). Her version was produced by Michael Cretu and Jens Gad. It was released on 25 March 2002 and reached number 76 on the official German singles chart.

Track listing
 CD maxi single
"Such a Shame" (Radio Edit) — 4:18
"Such a Shame" (Straight Dance Mix) — 7:54
"Such a Shame" (Cool Club Mix) — 5:22
"Such a Shame" (Karaoke Version) — 4:18

Charts

An Pierlé version
An Pierlé recorded a cover of "Such a Shame" for her 2013 album Strange Days. The song reached number 45 in the Walloon region of Belgium.

See also
List of number-one singles of the 1980s (Switzerland)

References

1984 songs
1984 singles
1990 singles
2002 singles
Talk Talk songs
EMI Records singles
Parlophone singles
Music videos directed by Tim Pope
Number-one singles in Switzerland
Sandra (singer) songs
Virgin Records singles
Songs written by Mark Hollis (musician)
Song recordings produced by Tim Friese-Greene
Music based on novels